This is a timeline documenting events of jazz in the year 2019.

Events

January 
 10 – The 18th All Ears festival starts in Oslo (January 10 – 12).
 11 – The 5th annual Tucson Jazz Festival starts in Tucson, Arizona (January 11 – 21).
 24 –  The 38th annual Djangofestival starts on Cosmopolite in Oslo, Norway (January 24–26).
 31
 The 8th Bodø Jazz Open Vinterjazz starts in Bodø, Norway (January 31 – February 2).
 The 21st Polarjazz Festival starts in Longyearbyen, Svalbard (January 31 – February 3).

February 
 14 – The 14th Ice Music Festival starts in Geilo, Norway (February 14–16).
 26 – English saxophonist Trevor Watts celebrates his 80th birthday.
 28 – American saxophonist Charles Gayle celebrates his 80th birthday.

March 
 1 – The 15th Jakarta International Java Jazz Festival starts in Jakarta, Indonesia (March 1 – 3).
 6 – The 50th Turku Jazz Festival starts in Åbo, Finland (March 6 – 10).
 16 – American violinist Jerry Goodman (Mahavishnu Orchestra) celebrates his 70th birthday.
 22 – The Blue House Youth Jazz Festival starts in Stockholm, Sweden (March 22 – 24).
 29 – The 20th Cape Town International Jazz Festival starts in Cape Town, South Africa (March 29 – 30).

April 
 12 – The 46th Vossajazz starts in Voss, Norway (April 12 – 14).
 24 – The 32nd April Jazz Espoo starts (April 25 – 29).
 26 – The 8th Torino Jazz Festival starts in Turin (April 26 – May 4).
 30 – The International Jazz Day.

May 
 3 – The Balejazz starts in Balestrand (May 3 – 5).
 6 – The 30th MaiJazz starts in Stavanger, Norway (May 6 – 12).
 8 – The 15th AnJazz, the Hamar Jazz Festival starts at Hamar, Norway (May 8 – 12).
 16 – The 18th Festival Jazz à Saint-Germain-des-Prés starts in Paris, France (May 16 – 27).
 24 – The 47th Nattjazz starts in Bergen, Norway (May 24 – June 1).

June 
 12 – The Bergenfest starts in Bergen (June 12 – 15).
 13 – The Norwegian Wood music festival starts in Oslo (June 13 – 15).
 26 – The Leopolis Jazz Fest (previously Alfa Jazz Fest) opens in Lviv, Ukraine (June 26–30).
 27 – The Festival International de Jazz de Montréal opens in Montréal, Canada (June 27 - July 6).
 28
 The 39th Jazz à Vienne starts in Vienne, France (June 28 - July 13).
 The 53rd Montreux Jazz Festival starts in Montreux, Switzerland (June 28 - July 13).

July 
 3 – The Kongsberg Jazzfestival opens at Kongsberg consert (August 3 – 6).
 4 – The 23rd Skånevik Bluesfestival starts in Skånevik, Norway (July 4 – 6).
 5
 The Baltic Jazz Festival starts in Dalsbruk (July 5 – 7).
 The Love Supreme Jazz Festival starts in Lewes, East Sussex (July 5 – 7).
 The 41st Copenhagen Jazz Festival starts in Copenhagen, Denmark (July 5 – 14).
 11 – The 18th Stavernfestivalen starts in Stavern (August 11 – 13).
 12
 The 44th North Sea Jazz Festival starts in The Hague, Netherlands ( July 12–14).
 The 54th Pori Jazz Festival starts in Pori, Finland (July 12 – 20).
 The 46th Umbria Jazz Festival starts in Perugia, Italy (July 12 – 21).
 13 – The 31st Aarhus Jazz Festival starts in Aarhus, Denmark (July 13 – 20).
 15 – The Moldejazz starts in Molde (August 15 – 20).
 16
 The 72nd Nice Jazz Festival starts in Nice, France (July 16 – 20).
 The 43rd Jazz de Vitoria starts in Gasteiz, Spain (July 16 – 20).
 24 – The 24th Canal Street Festival starts in Arendal (July 24 – 27).

August 
 2
 The 63rd Newport Jazz Festival starts in Newport, Rhode Island (August 2 – 4).
 The Nišville International Jazz Festival starts in Niš, Serbia (August 2 – 11).
 6 – The 20th Øyafestivalen starts in Oslo, Norway (August 6 – 10).
 8 – The 33rd Sildajazz starts in Haugesund, Norway (August 8 – 9).
9 – The 35th Brecon Jazz Festival starts in Brecon, Wales (August 9 – 11).
 11 – The 34th Oslo Jazzfestival starts in Oslo, Norway (August 11 – 17).

September 
 5 – The 14th Punktfestivalen opens in Kristiansand (September 5–7).
 27 – The 62nd Monterey Jazz Festival starts in Monterey, California (September 27 – 29).

October 
 17 – The 37th DølaJazz starts in Lillehammer (October 17 – 20).
 24 – The 41st Guinness Cork Jazz Festival starts in Cork City, Ireland (October 24 – 28).
 31 – The 56th JazzFest Berlin, also known as The Berlin Jazz Festival starts in Berlin (October 31 – November 3).

November 
 3 – American saxophonist and trumpeter Joe McPhee celebrates his 80th birthday.

December 
 25 – American pianist Bob James celebrates his 80th birthday.

Albums released

January

February 

22 February 2019 The Gleaners by Larry Grenadier

March

April

May

Deaths

January 
 5 – Alvin Fielder, American drummer (born 1935).
 9 – Joseph Jarman, American saxophonist, Art Ensemble of Chicago (born 1937).
 13 – Willie Murphy, American singer and pianist (born 1943).
 16 – Chris Wilson, Australian singer and guitarist (born 1956).
 21 – Marcel Azzola, French accordionist (born 1927).
 23 – Oliver Mtukudzi, Zimbabwean guitarist (born 1952).
 26 – Michel Legrand, French composer, arranger, conductor, and pianist (born 1932).

February 
 15 – Kofi Burbridge, American keyboardist and flautist, Tedeschi Trucks Band (born 1961).
 16 – Ken Nordine, American spoken word jazz artist (born 1920).
 17 – Ethel Ennis, American singer and pianist (born 1932).
 28 - Ed Bickert, Canadian jazz guitarist

March 
 5 – Jacques Loussier, French jazz pianist and film score composer (born 1934)

December 
 7 – Joe McQueen, American saxophonist (born 1919).

See also

 List of 2019 albums
 List of jazz festivals
 List of years in jazz
 2010s in jazz
 2019 in music

References

External links 
 History Of Jazz Timeline: 2019 at All About Jazz

2010s in jazz
Jazz